The Night Invader is a 1943 British, black-and-white, drama, thriller, war film, directed by Herbert Mason, produced by Max Milder for Warner Bros. - First National Productions Ltd. the British subsidiary of Warner Bros. and starring Ronald Shiner as Witsen, Anne Crawford and David Farrar.

Plot
Dick Marlow, a British agent, has parachuted into the occupied Netherlands to retrieve vital documents.  Whilst on the trail of the papers, he poses occasionally as an American journalist and a Gestapo officer.  He meets and falls in love with a Dutch woman who professes solidarity with the British, but matters become complicated and dangerous when it transpires that the woman's brother is in possession of the documents Dick Marlow needs, and is far less kindly disposed towards the British than his sister.

Cast
 Anne Crawford as Karen Lindley
 David Farrar as Dick Marlow
 Sybille Binder as Baroness von Klaveren
 Carl Jaffe as Count von Biebrich
 Marius Goring as Oberleutnant
 Jenny Lovelace as Liesje von Klaveren
 Kynaston Reeves as Sir Michael
 George Carney as Conductor
 Ronald Shiner as Witsen
 Martin Walker as Jimmy Archer

Availability
No print of The Night Invader is known to survive and the film is classed as "missing, believed lost".

References

External links 
 
 
 

1943 films
1940s spy films
British spy films
British thriller films
British war drama films
1940s English-language films
Films directed by Herbert Mason
British black-and-white films
Films based on British novels
Films set in the Netherlands
British World War II propaganda films
Films about Dutch resistance
World War II spy films
Lost British films
Films scored by Jack Beaver
1943 drama films